Tall Anjir (also Romanized as Tall Anjīr) is a village in Somghan Rural District, Chenar Shahijan District, Kazerun County, Fars Province, Iran. At the 2006 census, its population was 290, in 54 families.

References 

Populated places in Chenar Shahijan County